Aleksandr Andreyevich Komarov (born 5 May 1999) is a Russian Greco-Roman wrestler. He is a two-time U20 Junior World Champion and two-time U17 Cadet World Champion. In European level, Komarov won four European junior titles. He won his first medal at the European Championships in 2019.

In 2021, he won the gold medal in the 87 kg event at the 2021 U23 World Wrestling Championships held in Belgrade, Serbia.

References

1999 births
Living people
Russian male sport wrestlers
Sportspeople from Saint Petersburg
European Wrestling Championships medalists
20th-century Russian people
21st-century Russian people